The 22nd Stinkers Bad Movie Awards were released by the Hastings Bad Cinema Society in 2000 to honour the worst films the film industry had to offer in 1999. Founder Ray Wright listed Pokemon: The First Movie among his five worst movies of the 1990s alongside Batman and Robin, It's Pat, Crash, and Nothing but Trouble. Listed as follows are the different categories with their respective winners and nominees, including Worst Picture and its dishonourable mentions, which are films that were considered for Worst Picture but ultimately failed to make the final ballot (42 total). All winners are highlighted.

Winners and Nominees

Worst Picture

Dishonourable Mentions 

 The Astronaut's Wife (New Line)
 The Bachelor (New Line)
 Big Daddy (Columbia)
 Breakfast of Champions (Hollywood)
 Bringing Out The Dead (Paramount)
 Chill Factor (Warner Bros.)
 Crazy in Alabama (Columbia)
 Detroit Rock City (New Line)
 Dudley Do-Right (Universal)
 8MM (Columbia)
 End of Days (Universal)
 Eyes Wide Shut (Warner Bros.)
 Free Enterprise (Anchor Bay)
 Gloria (Columbia)
 The Haunting (DreamWorks)
 House on Haunted Hill (Warner Bros.)
 Idle Hands (Columbia)
 Instinct (aka InSTINK) (Touchstone)
 Jakob The Liar (Columbia)
 Jawbreaker (TriStar)
 The King and I (Warner Bros.)
 Life (Universal)
 Lost & Found (Warner Bros.)
 The Love Letter (DreamWorks)
 Love Stinks (Independent Artists)
 The Messenger: The Story of Joan of Arc (Columbia)
 Music of the Heart (Miramax)
 My Favorite Martian (Disney)
 The Omega Code (Providence Entertainment)
 Pokémon the First Movie (Warner Bros.)
 The Rage: Carrie 2 (MGM)
 Simon Sez (Columbia)
 Star Wars Episode I: The Phantom Menace (Fox)
 Stigmata (MGM)
 The Story of Us (Universal)
 Superstar (Paramount)
 Teaching Mrs. Tingle (Miramax)
 200 Cigarettes (Paramount)
 Universal Soldier: The Return (TriStar)
 Varsity Blues (Paramount)
 Virus (Universal)
 Wing Commander (Fox)

Worst Director

Worst Actor

Worst Actress

Worst Supporting Actor

Worst Supporting Actress

Most Painfully Unfunny Comedy

Worst On-Screen Couple

Worst Song or Song Performance Featured in a Film or Its End Credits

Worst Screenplay for a Film Grossing Over $100M Worldwide Using Hollywood Math

Worst Fake Accent

Worst On-Screen Hairstyle (Male)

Worst On-Screen Hairstyle (Female)

Most Unwelcome Direct-to-Video Release

Worst Remake

Worst Sequel or Prequel

The Remake, Sequel, or Prequel Nobody Was Clamoring For

Worst Resurrection of a TV Show

Least "Special" Special Effects

Biggest Disappointment (Films That Didn't Live Up to Their Hype)

Most Botched Comic Relief (Ideas That Couldn't Have Looked Good, Even On Paper)

Worst Screen Debut

Musicians Who Shouldn't Be Acting

Most Intrusive Musical Score

Worst Performance by a Child in a Featured Role

Worst Achievement in Animation

The Founders Award (What Were They Thinking)? 
 The Motion Picture Association of America for rating Eyes Wide Shut "R"

Films with multiple wins and nominations

The following films received multiple nominations:

Note: For each film with an asterisk, one of those nominations was the Founders Award.

The following films received multiple wins:

Mike Lancaster's Review of The Underground Comedy Movie 

Founder Mike Lancaster cited The Underground Comedy Movie as the worst movie he ever paid to see. Despite this, it received only one nomination for Musicians Who Shouldn't Be Acting. His review is as follows:

Notes

References 

Stinkers Bad Movie Awards
Stinkers Bad Movie Awards